Facundo Nicolás Simioli (born April 7, 1988 in Buenos Aires) is an Argentinian football defender.

He lives in San Antonio de Areco, Buenos Aires. Simioli played 83 matches and scored 13 goals with Santa Tecla in the Primera División de Fútbol de El Salvador.

References

Living people
1988 births
Argentine footballers
Argentine expatriate footballers
Association football defenders
Expatriate footballers in El Salvador
C.D. FAS footballers
Footballers from Buenos Aires